Mean platelet volume (MPV) is a machine-calculated measurement of the average size of platelets found in blood and is typically included in blood tests as part of the CBC. Since the average platelet size is larger when the body is producing increased numbers of platelets, the MPV test results can be used to make inferences about platelet production in bone marrow or platelet destruction problems.

An increased mean platelet volume (MPV) increases the risk to suffer a heart disease 

MPV may be higher when there is destruction of platelets. This may be seen in immune thrombocytopenic purpura (ITP), myeloproliferative diseases and Bernard–Soulier syndrome. It may also be related to pre-eclampsia and recovery from transient hypoplasia.

Abnormally low MPV values may correlate with thrombocytopenia when it is due to impaired production of megakaryocytes in the bone marrow, such as in aplastic anemia. A low MPV may indicate inflammatory bowel disease (IBD), such as Crohn's disease and ulcerative colitis. A high MPV is also a bad prognostic marker in patients with sepsis or septic shock. In addition, low MPV may correlate with abnormally small platelet size, sometimes a symptom of a spectrum referred to as Wiskott–Aldrich syndrome (WAS), caused by a genetic mutation of the WAS gene.

Sample for MPV testing is obtained in a Lavender-Top  EDTA tube. A typical range of platelet volumes is 9.4–12.3 fL (femtolitre), equivalent to spheres 2.65 to 2.9 µm in diameter.

Conditions associated with altered MPV

Decreased MPV 
 Cytotoxic chemotherapy
 Hypersplenism
 Reactive thrombocytosis
 Iron-deficiency anemia
 Gilbert's syndrome
 Acquired Immunodeficiency Syndrome (AIDS)
 Wiskott–Aldrich syndrome
 X linked thrombocytopenia
 Crohn's disease
 Ulcerative colitis
 Aplastic anemia
 Megaloblastic anemia

Increased MPV 
 Immune thrombocytopenia
 Disseminated intravascular coagulation
 Myeloproliferative disorders
 Administration of erythropoietin / thrombopoietin
 Recovery from transient hypoplasia
 Gray platelet syndrome
 GATA-1 mutation
 vWD Type 2B
 Platelet Type vWD
 Paris-Trousseau syndrome
 Mediterranean macrothrombocytopenia
 Bernard–Soulier syndrome 
 MYH9-related disorders
 21q11 deletion syndrome
 Chronic myelogenous leukemia
 Post-splenectomy
 Vasculitis
 Diabetes mellitus
 Pre-eclampsia
 Chronic kidney disease
 Respiratory diseases
 Thrombocytopenia secondary to sepsis
 Hyperthyroidism
 Hypothyroidism
 Myocardial infarction
 Artificial heart valves
 Massive hemorrhage

Inherited thrombocytopenia with normal MPV 
 ATRUS Syndrome
 Thrombocytopenia 2 (THC2)
 Congenital amegakaryocytic thrombocytopenia
 TAR syndrome
 Familial platelet disorder with predisposition to AML

References

Further reading 

 
 
 
 

Blood tests